Tal Kachila (born June 26, 1992) is an Israeli professional footballer who plays as a centre-back.

Club career
Kachila played from the age of 14 with Beitar Jerusalem's youth team, deciding to become a centre-back, like his father, after combining volleyball and football.

Kachila made his debut for Beitar Jerusalem on 11 August 2012, in a match in the Toto Cup against F.C. Ashdod, coming on as a substitute in the 89th minute.

5 months later, Kachila made his debut in the State Cup, coming on as a substitute in the 67th minute in a 5–0 victory over Maccabi Umm al-Fahm.

On 17 February 2013, Kachila made his league debut, playing in a 3–0 loss to Hapoel Haifa.

On 2 February 2017 loaned to Bnei Yehuda.

On 2 July 2019 signed  with Atromitos F.C from the Super League Greece

International career
In October 2010, Kachila made his international debut, playing with the Israeli under-19 national team, in a 3–0 victory against the Armenian under-19 national team in the UEFA U19 Championship.

On 18 November 2013, Kachila made his debut for the Israeli under-21 national team, playing a 4–3 loss against the Portuguese under-21 national team during the UEFA U21 Championship 2015 qualifying round.

Personal life
Kachila is the son of Ehud Kachila, who played 13 years for Beitar Jerusalem as a centre-back.

Honours

Club
Bnei Yehuda
Israel State Cup (1): 2016–17

References

1992 births
Living people
Israeli Jews
Israeli footballers
Beitar Jerusalem F.C. players
Bnei Yehuda Tel Aviv F.C. players
Atromitos F.C. players
Hapoel Hadera F.C. players
Sektzia Ness Ziona F.C. players
Israeli Premier League players
Super League Greece players
Expatriate footballers in Greece
Israeli expatriate sportspeople in Greece
Israel under-21 international footballers
Footballers from Jerusalem
Association football central defenders